The 1939–40 National Challenge Cup was the 27th edition of the United States Football Association's annual open cup. Today, the tournament is known as the 
U.S. Open Cup. Teams from the American Soccer League II competed in the tournament, based on qualification methods in their base region. 

The tournament was unique in that it is the only edition not to produce an overall winner. After drawing 2–2 on aggregate, Baltimore S.C. and Chicago Sparta could not agree on a third, tie-breaking match. As a result, the two clubs shared the title.

Eastern Bracket 

Numbers in parentheses next to the match score represent the results of a replay.

1 First match was abandoned after 35 minutes due to rain
2 Replay went to extra time

Western Bracket 

Numbers in parentheses next to the match score represent the results of a replay.

1 First and second match went into extra time
2 Third match had to be abandoned in the 70th minute due to crowd trouble
3 Second match went into extra time

External links 
 1940 National Challenge Cup results – TheCup.us

U.S. Open Cup
U.S. Open Cup